Lamoria glaucalis is a species of snout moth in the genus Lamoria. It was described by Aristide Caradja in 1925. It is found in China.

References

Moths described in 1925
Tirathabini
Moths of Japan